James John "JHart" Abrahart Jr. (born 12 June 1988) is a British singer, songwriter, record producer and arranger, based in Los Angeles. Signed by Mike Caren to Artist Publishing Group in 2013, he has been nominated for several Grammy Awards and worked with popular artists including Usher, Justin Bieber, Camila Cabello, Kygo, Chris Brown, Little Mix, Martin Garrix, OneRepublic, Jennifer Lopez, Keith Urban, Jon Bellion, Kelsea Ballerini and Kevin Gates. His output has amassed over 25 million in sales.

Early life 
Born in Essex, UK, he spent most of his childhood in Brentwood with his parents, brother and two sisters. His first introduction to music came when his parents bought him a drum kit, after he suffered a serious skiing accident during a school trip to the Alps. He attended Brentwood Preparatory School until the age of 12, when his parents decided to move to Atlanta, Georgia to establish the family business overseas.

Abrahart's passion for writing music intensified after joining his school gospel choir in Atlanta, with whom he sang regularly. At home he began to create and mix beats, inspired by the music of Usher, Kirk Franklin and J Moss. In 2008, Abrahart was offered a 12-month internship with producer Polow da Don where he was first introduced to the professional music scene, and just a year later he achieved his first professional breakthrough, Priscilla Renea's "Pretty Girl" on her 2009 album Jukebox.

Music career

Major breakthrough 
Abrahart's major breakthrough came in 2011, through a chance e-mail to manager Mike Caren, who was impressed with the tracks, and consequently flew Abrahart to Los Angeles to work with Cody Simpson. That same year, he worked on projects for Flo Rida, Wynter Gordon and Karmin, before re-locating to Los Angeles the following year at the age of 22. During the summer of 2012, Abrahart received widespread attention for his track "Take You", which featured on Justin Bieber's third studio album Believe. The album reached No. 1 in 16 countries, and sold over 3 million copies worldwide. Bieber performed the song the following year at the 2013 Billboard Music Awards.

Notable work 
That same year, Abrahart penned Trey Songz' UK single "Never Again" from his studio album Chapter V, and co-wrote Jason Derulo's "Undefeated", which was performed by Derulo on the season 11 finale of American Idol. A year later he collaborated again with Derulo, this time on "Tattoo", the title track for his third studio album. In 2014, Abrahart achieved greater commercial success, with releases from Timeflies, Inna and Pitbull, Fifth Harmony, and most notably Songz' single "Change Your Mind", from his sixth studio album Trigga, which reached No. 1 on the Billboard 200.

In January 2015, Abrahart collaborated with Derulo and Hardwell on the track "Follow Me Home", which was released on the DJ's debut studio album United We Are. The album reached No.1 in the Netherlands and No. 2 on the Billboard Dance/Electronic Albums chart.

On 17 March 2015, Martin Garrix released his new single "Don't Look Down" featuring Usher, which was co-written by Abrahart. The track is the first official single from Garrix's upcoming debut album, set to be released later this year. The single reached No. 9 in the UK Charts. The same day, Atlantic Records released the soundtrack album for the film Furious 7, which features Abrahart's collaboration with Sevyn Streeter and Chloe Angelides, "How Bad Do You Want It (Oh Yeah)". The track was released as a promotional single on 23 February 2015.

In November 2015, Justin Bieber released his Billboard No. 1 album Purpose. Abrahart co-wrote two songs on the album, including "Mark My Words" and the single "Company" (#53 Billboard Hot 100). That same month, Fleur East released her debut single "Sax", which was co-written by Abrahart. The single has since been certified Platinum.

In 2016, Abrahart co-wrote Keith Urban's hit single "Wasted Time" from his album Ripcord. The single reached No. 1 on the Billboard Country Airplay Chart and the album debuted at No. 1 on the Billboard Top Country Albums Chart.

JHart also co-wrote Kevin Gates' "Know Better", which is featured on the Suicide Squad Soundtrack.

Featured artist 
In the summer of 2012, Abrahart made his debut as a recording artist under his alias "JHart", his vocals featuring on Paul Oakenfold's dance hit "Surrender". In 2014, he penned and featured on Dirty South's "One Breath" from the album With You, and the following year, his collaboration with Vicetone, "Follow Me", was announced as the anthem for the 2015 Ultra Music Festival. The track was premièred online by Entertainment Weekly the day before its official release.

On 18 May 2015, Tritonal released "Untouchable", their new collaboration with fellow dance group Cash Cash. The single features the vocals of Abrahart.

Abrahart continued his dance success by collaborating with Australian DJ Tommy Trash on his single "Wake the Giant". The track was co-written and features vocals from Abrahart, and was released on Dutch dance label Armada Music on 13 July 2015.

Abrahart has cemented his position in the American music scene as one of the most influential young writers of his generation; in 2013, he was awarded the coveted Vilcek Prize for Creative Promise in Contemporary Music, awarded to young foreign-born artists who have demonstrated exceptional achievements.

Songwriting credits 
 indicates a background vocal contribution.

 indicates an un-credited lead vocal contribution.

 indicates a credited vocal/featured artist contribution.

References 

1988 births
Living people
English record producers
English pop singers
English songwriters
People from Brentwood, Essex
English emigrants to the United States
Musicians from Atlanta